Landek is a small settlement in the Municipality of Vojnik in eastern Slovenia. The area is included in the Savinja Statistical Region. It is part of the traditional region of Styria.

References

External links
Landek at Geopedia

Populated places in the Municipality of Vojnik